William Hogg may refer to:

Billy Hogg (1879–1937), English footballer, outside right, played in Scotland
Billy Hogg (Scottish footballer) (fl. 1920s), Scottish football wing forward 
Willie Hogg (born 1955), British cricket player
Bill Hogg (1881–1909), New York baseball player
William Clifford Hogg (1875–1930), civic leader, son of Texas Governor Jim Hogg

See also
William Lindsay-Hogg of the Lindsay-Hogg baronets